Roger Cross (born October 19, 1969) is a Jamaican-born Canadian actor who has made numerous appearances in several films and television series, mostly on productions shot in Canada. He is known for his work as CTU Agent Curtis Manning in the popular American television series 24. His other notable television roles include First Wave, Continuum, Motive, and Dark Matter.

Early life
Cross was born in Christiana, Jamaica. When he was eleven, his family emigrated to Canada, settling in Vancouver, British Columbia. He graduated with a degree in Aviation and General Studies from Trinity Western University.  Before his acting career, Cross was a professional pilot.

Career
Cross began his career in the 1990s playing guest roles in such series as Street Justice, The X-Files, Sliders, Stargate SG-1, Highlander: The Series, Relic Hunter, The 4400, Higher Ground, Star Trek: Enterprise, and Chuck.<ref name="sci">{{cite web|title=Past Imperfect: Interview with Dark Matter'''s Roger Cross|url=http://scifiandtvtalk.typepad.com/scifiandtvtalk/2015/07/past-imperfect-interview-with-dark-matters-roger-cross.html|website=SciFiAndTvTalk|access-date=March 26, 2017}}</ref>

From 1998 to 2001, he starred as a lead character, Joshua Bridges, on the sci-fi series First Wave. 

From 2005 to 2007, Cross achieved wider recognition for his role as CTU Agent Curtis Manning on the Fox television drama 24. In 2009, he appeared as DJ and drag queen Sunset Boulevard/Sonny Benson in the Showtime series The L Word. 

In 2010, Cross did voice-over work as "Ulysses" in the Fallout: New Vegas add-ons, "Old World Blues" and "Lonesome Road".

Cross's other notable television roles include Staff Sergeant Boyd Bloom in Motive, Detective Lucas Hilton in Arrow, Reggie Fitzwilliam in The Strain, Travis Verta in Continuum, and Six in Dark Matter.

In addition to his work on television, Cross has appeared in such films as The Chronicles of Riddick, X2, Ballistic: Ecks vs. Sever, Beautiful Joe, Free Willy 3: The Rescue, World Trade Center, Re-Kill, and Mad Money.Personal life
Cross is in a long-term relationship with actress and yoga instructor Josephine Jacob. They have two sons, Kaniel Jacob-Cross and actor Gabriel Jacob-Cross, whose appearances include The Man in the High Castle (2015) and Snowpiercer'' (2020).

Filmography

Film

Television

Video games

References

External links
 

1969 births
Living people
20th-century Canadian male actors
21st-century Canadian male actors
Black Canadian male actors
Canadian male film actors
Canadian male television actors
Canadian male voice actors
Canadian people of Jamaican descent
Jamaican expatriates in Canada
Jamaican expatriates in the United States
Jamaican male film actors
Jamaican male television actors
Male actors from Vancouver
20th-century Jamaican male actors
21st-century Jamaican male actors
Trinity Western University alumni